Nicke is a male given name. Notable people with this name include:

 Nicke Andersson (born 1972), Swedish musician
 Nicke Borg (born 1973), Swedish musician
 Nicke Kabamba (born 1993), English football player
 Nicke Lignell (born 1966), Finnish actor
 Nicke Widyawati (born 1967), Indonesian businesswoman